The Santa Cruz Sand Crabs (also called the Beachcombers) were a minor league baseball team located in Santa Cruz, California. They competed primarily in the California League between 1888 and 1909.

External links
Baseball Reference

Defunct California League teams
Defunct California State League teams
Defunct Pacific Coast League teams
Baseball teams established in 1888
Baseball teams disestablished in 1909
Defunct baseball teams in California
1888 establishments in California
1909 disestablishments in California
Sports in Santa Cruz County, California